The August 2008 Dera Ismail Khan suicide bombing took place on 19 August 2008, near the Emergency Ward of District Headquarter Hospital in Dera Ismail Khan, killing 32, including 7 policemen. Tehreek-i-Taliban Pakistan claimed responsibility for the attack.

Events

Bombing 
Early in the day of the attack, a Shiite scholar Basit Ali was shot dead by gunmen. Many Shii gathered there to protest his death when a suicide bomber blew himself up in the crowd. The blast created many casualties, including the policemen who were controlling the crowd.

Aftermath 
The Army took control of the area. The injured were brought to military and public hospitals. The blast led to fear of eruption between sects, leading many shops, markets and business centers to close. Section 144 was imposed and pillion-riding was banned for an indefinite period.

Reactions

Shia Community 
The Shia community observed a three-day mourning from Wednesday in the city for victims of attack.

Perpetrators
The spokesman of Tehreek-i-Taliban Pakistan Moulvi Omer claimed responsibility for the attack calling it a retaliation against Operation Sherdill and said that the suicide attacks would continue until the military stopped operations in Swat and Bajaur Agency. However Omer disagreed with public opinion of the motive of attack and said that the attack was not against religioun but was against government authorities and security forces.

Victim's memorial ceremony 
Three years after the attack, a memorial ceremony to honour the victims was held on 19 August 2011 and was attended by many people, including the relatives of 20 deceased and 25 injured who belonged to the same family.

References

2008 murders in Pakistan
Suicide bombings in 2008
21st-century mass murder in Pakistan
Terrorist incidents in Dera Ismail Khan
Tehrik-i-Taliban Pakistan attacks
Terrorist incidents in Pakistan in 2008
August 2008 events in Pakistan
Islamic terrorist incidents in 2008
Suicide bombings in Pakistan
Attacks on hospitals
Building bombings in Pakistan